Bagthorpe is a village and former civil parish, now in the parish of Bagthorpe with Barmer, in the King's Lynn and West Norfolk district, in the county of in Norfolk, England. In 1931 the parish had a population of 68. On 1 April 1935 the parish was abolished to form "Bagthorpe with Barmer".

The name of the village derives from 'Bakki's/Bak's outlying farm/settlement' or 'Bacca's outlying farm/settlement'. Although this is uncertain.

References

External links
 
 

Villages in Norfolk
Former civil parishes in Norfolk
King's Lynn and West Norfolk